Ronald Wayne Walters (born March 9, 1948) is a retired professional ice hockey player who played 166 games in the World Hockey Association.  He played for the Indianapolis Racers, Edmonton Oilers, and Los Angeles Sharks.

External links

1948 births
Canadian ice hockey centres
Edmonton Oilers (WHA) players
Fort Worth Wings players
Ice hockey people from Alberta
Indianapolis Racers players
Living people
Los Angeles Sharks players
People from the County of Paintearth No. 18